

National (state) railways 
  Albania - Hekurudha Shqiptare (HSH)
   Armenia - Հայկական Երկաթուղի փբը (ՀԵ) Haycacan Yerkatuwi (HJe)
   Austria - Österreichische Bundesbahnen (ÖBB)
  Azerbaijan — Azərbaycan Dəmir Yolları (ADY)
   Belarus - Беларуская чыгунка (БЧ)
   Belgium - Nationale Maatschappij der Belgische Spoorwegen (NMBS) - Société Nationale des Chemins de fer Belges (SNCB)
  Bosnia and Herzegovina - Željeznice Bosne i Hercegovine
   Bulgaria - Български държавни железници (Balgarski Darzhavni Zheleznitsi) (БДЖ - BDŻ)
   Croatia - Hrvatske Željeznice (HŽ)
  Czech Republic - České dráhy (ČD) 
    Cyprus - Cyprus Government Railway (CGR)
   Denmark - Danske Statsbaner (DSB)
   Estonia - Eesti Raudtee (EVR)
   Finland - Valtion Rautatiet (VR)
  France - Société Nationale des Chemins de fer Français (SNCF)
   Georgia - საქართველოს რკინიგზა (სრ)
  Germany - Deutsche Bahn (DB)
   Greece - Οργανισμός Σιδηροδρόμων Ελλάδος (ΟΣΕ) - Hellenic Railways Organisation (OSE)
   Hungary - Magyar Államvasutak (MÁV)
   Ireland - Iarnród Éireann (IÉ)
   Italy - Ferrovie dello Stato (FS) - Trenitalia
  Kazakhstan - Kazakhstan Temir Zholy (KTŽ)
  Latvia - Latvijas dzelzceļš (LDZ)
  Liechtenstein - Zahnradbahn Honau–Lichtenstein (ZHB)
  Lithuania - Lietuvos Geležinkeliai (LTG)
  Luxembourg - Société Nationale des Chemins de Fer Luxembourgeois (CFL)
  Macedonia - Македонски Железници (Makedonski Železnici)(МЖ - MŽ) 
  Moldova - Calea Ferată din Moldova (CFM)
    Montenegro - Željeznica Crne Gore (ŽCG)
   Netherlands - Nederlandse Spoorwegen (NS)
  Norway - Vygruppen (Vy)
  Poland - Polskie Koleje Państwowe (PKP)
  Portugal - Comboios de Portugal (CP)
  Monaco - Monaco-Monte Carlo Metro
  Romania - Căile Ferate Române (CFR)
  Russia - Российские Железные Дороги (Rossiyskiye Zhyelyezniye Dorogi) (РЖД - RŻD)
  San Marino - Ferrovia Rimini-San Marino (SFVET) 
  Serbia - Železnice Srbije (ŽS)
   Slovakia - Železničná spoločnosť Slovensko, a. s. (ZSSK)
   Slovenia - Slovenske železnice (SŽ)
   Spain - Renfe
   Switzerland - Schweizerische Bundesbahnen (SBB) - Chemins de fer fédéraux suisses (CFF) - Ferrovie federali svizzere (FFS) - Viafiers federalas svizras (VFS)
   Sweden - SJ AB (SJ)
   Turkey - Türkiye Cumhuriyeti Devlet Demiryolları İşletmesi (TCDD)
   Ukraine - Укрзалізниця (Ukrzaliznytsia) (УЗ - UZ)
   United Kingdom - British Rail (BR) (privatized 1997)
   Vatican City - Ferrovie del Vaticano

Regional railways 

Austria
 Graz-Köflacher Eisenbahn (GKB)
 Salzburger Lokalbahn (SLB)
 Steiermärkische Landesbahnen (STLB)
 Zillertalbahn (ZB)
 Győr-Sopron-Ebenfurti Vasút (GySEV) – Raab-Oedenburg-Ebenfurth-Eisebahnen (ROeEE)
France
 Eurostar
Belgium
Eurostar
Czech Republic
 NH-TRANS, a.s.
 RegioJet
 Železniční společnost Tanvald
 Plzeňská dráha
 Železnici Desná (ŽD)
Denmark
  Danish railways - Nordjyske Jernbaner
 De sjællandske Statsbaner
 Hohenzollerische Landesbahn AG (HzL)
 Vogtlandbahn (VB)
Hungary
 Győr-Sopron-Ebenfurti Vasút (GySEV) – Raab-Oedenburg-Ebenfurth-Eisebahnen (ROeEE)
Italy
 Ferrovia Circumetnea (FCE)
 Ferrovie Nord Milano (FNM)
 Ferrovia Alta Valtellina (FAV)
 Ferrovia Valle Seriana (FVS)
 Società Nazionale Ferrovie e Tramvie (Brescia Iseo Edolo) 
 Ferrovia Valle Brembana
 Ferrovia Mantova Peschiera
 Ferrovia Intra Omegna (SAVTE)
 Ferrovie Reggiane (CCFR)
 Ferrovie Modenesi
 Ferrovie Padane
 Ferrovia Parma Suzzara
 Ferrovia Suzzara Ferrara (FSF) 
 Ferrovia Casalecchio Vignola (FCV) 
 Ferrovia Torino Ceres (FTC) 
 Ferrovia Canavesana 
 Ferrovie Elettriche Biellesi
 Ferrovia Rezzato Vobarno
Ferrovia Piacenza Bettola (SIFT) 
 Ferrovia Lana Postal
 Ferrovia Transatesina - Bolzano Caldaro
 Ferrovia Bribano Agordo
 Ferrovia Udine Cividale (FUC)
 Ferrovia Adria Mestre
 Ferrovia Centrale Umbra (FCU)
 Ferrovia Siena-Buonconvento-Monte Antico
 Ferrovia Sangritana
 Ferrovie siciliane
 Ferrovie del Sud Est (FSE)
 La Ferroviaria Italiana
 Ferrovie del Gargano
 Ferrovie del Nord Barese
 Ferrovia Alifana
 Ferrovia Cumana
 Ferrovia Benevento-Cancello
 Ferrovia Avellino-Rocchetta Sant'Antonio
 Ferrovie Appulo Lucane
 Ferrovia Genova Casella
 Ferrovia delle Dolomiti
 Ferrovia Cogne Acquefredde
Ferrovia Stresa Mottarone (closed in 1963)
 Ferrovia Intra Premeno
Ferrovia Trento-Malè
Ferrovia della Val di Fiemme
Ferrovia del Renon
 Ferrovia Alto Pistoiese
 Ferrovia Roma Fiuggi Alatri Frosinone
 Ferrovia Spoleto Norcia
 Ferrovia Circumvesuviana
 Ferrovie Calabro Lucane
 Ferrovia Circumetnea
 Strade Ferrate Secondarie della Sardegna
 Ferrovie Complementari Sarde
 Ferrovie Meridionali Sarde
Strade Ferrate Sarde
 Ferrovie della Sardegna
 Ferrovia Siracusa Ragusa Vizzini
 Ferrovia Basso Sebino
 Ferrovia Val d'Orcia
 Ferrovia Valmorea
 Ferrovia Domodossola-Locarno
 Sad Trasporto Locale S.p.a.
  (SSIF)
Norway
Tågkompaniet AB (TK)
Poland
 Arriva RP
 Koleje Dolnośląskie
 Koleje Mazowieckie
 Koleje Śląskie
 Koleje Wielkopolskie
 PKP Intercity
 Przewozy Regionalne
 Szybka Kolej Miejska (Warsaw)
 Szybka Kolej Miejska (Tricity)
 Warszawska Kolej Dojazdowa
Romania
Regio Călători
Interregional  Călători
Softrans
Transferoviar Călători (T.F.C.)
 Astra Trans Carpatic
Spain
Canfranero
Cercanías
El ferrocarril de la Minero Siderurgica de Ponferrada (MSP) 
Ferrocarril Santander-Mediterráneo
Ferrocarril Vasco-Asturiano
Ferrocarril de La Robla
Ferrocarril de Langreo
Ferrocarril del Almanzora
La línea de ferrocarril Baeza-Utiel
Metro de Palma de Mallorca
Ferrocarriles Secundarios de Castilla
Tren Camino de Santiago
Trenet de la Marina
Alta Velocidad (LAV) 
 Ferrocarril suburbano de Carabanchel
 Ferrocarrils de la Generalitat de Catalunya (FGC) 
Sweden
Bergkvist Svets & Mek Järnväg AB (BSMJ)
 Sydvästen AB (SV)
Tågkompaniet AB (TK)
Switzerland
 Appenzeller Bahnen (AB)
 BLS AG (BLS)
 Berner Oberland Bahn (BOB)
 BVZ Zermatt-Bahn (BVZ)
 Domodossola–Locarno railway (Centovallina)
 CISALPINO AG
 Furka Oberalp Bahn (FO)
 Glacier Express (GE)
 GoldenPass Line (GPL)
 Gornergratbahn (GB)
 Jungfraubahn (JB)
 Chemins de fer du Jura (CJ)
 Transports de Martigny et Régions SA 
 Matterhorn Gotthard Bahn (MGB)
 Montreux - Berner Oberland - Bahn (MOB)
 Regionalverkehr Bern-Solothurn (RBS) 
 Rhätische Bahn (RB)
 Südostbahn (SOB)
 Voralpen Express (VAE)
 Transports Publics du Chablais (TPC)
 Wilhelm Tell Express (WTE)
 Zentralbahn (ZB)
United Kingdom (at June 2022)
 Arriva Rail London
 Avanti West Coast
 Colas Rail
 CrossCountry
 DB Cargo UK
 DCRail
 Direct Rail Services
 East Midlands Railway
 Freightliner
 GB Railfreight
 Govia Thameslink Railway
 Grand Central
 Greater Anglia
 Great Western Railway
 Hull Trains
 Locomotive Services Limited
 London North Eastern Railway
 Lumo
 Merseyrail
 Northern Trains
 Rail Operations Group
 Riviera Trains
 ScotRail
 South Eastern Railway
 South Western Railway
 TfL Rail
 TransPennine Express
 Transport for Wales
 Vintage Trains
 West Coast Railways
 West Midlands Trains

Regional passenger and cargo railways 

Hungary
CER Vasúti Zrt
Magyar Magánvasút ZRt. (MMV)
Mátrai Erőmű Zrt.
MÁV-Hajdú Vasútépítő Kft.
Train Hungary Magánvasút Kft
Poland
Connex Polska sp. z o.o
KOLEJ NZGTK
KP Szczakowa S.A.
KP Kotlarnia S.A.
KP Kuźnica Warężyńska S.A.
PKN Orlen
Przedsiębiorstwo Transportu Kolejowego i Gospodarki Kamieniem S.A. w Rybniku (PTK)
Przedsiębiorstwo Transportu Kolejowego i Gospodarki Kamieniem Holding SA Zabrze (PTK)

Urban, municipal and local railways 
Austria
 Insbrucker Verkehrsbetriebe (IVB)
 Linzer Lokalbahn (LLB)
 Wiener Lokalbahnen AG (WLB)
 Germany
Karlsruher Verkehrsverbund (KVB)
Hungary
Budapesti Helyiérdekű Vasút (BHÉV)
Italy
Ferrovia Roma Ostia Lido
Ferrovia Roma Viterbo
Poland
PKP SKM sp. z o.o
 PKP WKD sp. z o.o
Spain
Metro de Madrid
Metro de Barcelona
Metro de Granada
Metro de Málaga
Metro de Santander
Metro de Sevilla

Cargo railways 

Austria
Rail Cargo Austria
Logistik- und Transport GmbH (LTE)
Germany, Netherlands, Denmark, Switzerland, Italy
Railion
Germany, France, Luxembourg and Switzerland
Rhealys
Germany, Netherlands
Bentheimer Eisenbahn
Slovakia
Železnična spoločnost' Cargo Slovakia (ZSCS)
Slovenia
Adria Transport
Hungary
MÁV Cargo
Italy
FS Cargo
Rail Traction Company
Norway
CargoNet
Poland
PKP CARGO SA
PKP LHS sp. z o.o.
Przedsiębiorstwo Transportu Kolejowego
Romania
CFR Marfa
Grup Feroviar Român
GP Rail Cargo
Transferoviar Grup
Vest Trans Rail
Via Terra Spedition
Cargo Trans Vagon
Constantin Grup
DB Cargo Romania
Rail Cargo Carrier- România
Tehnotrans Feroviar
CER-Fersped/EP Rail
Unicom Tranzit
Tim Rail Cargo
LTE-Rail Romania
PSP Cargo Group- Romania
Express Forwarding
Rofersped
Sweden
Green Cargo

Infrastructural and track railways 
Austria
ÖBB-Infrastruktur Betrieb AG
Bulgaria
Национална компания Железопътна инфраструктура
Czech Republic
Správa železniční dopravní cesty (SŽDC)
Slovakia
Železnice Slovenskej republiky (ŽSR)
Poland
PKP Polskie Linie Kolejowe SA
Romania
CFR SA
Sweden
Banverket

Rail transport in Europe